Abbans-Dessous is a commune in the Doubs department in the Bourgogne-Franche-Comté region of eastern France.

The inhabitants of the commune are known as Abbanais or Abbanaises.

The similarly named commune Abbans-Dessus lies 1.5 km to the south.

Geography
Abbans-Dessous is located some 20 km south-west of Besançon and 2 km south-east of Osselle. Access to the commune is by road D105 from Byans-sur-Doubs in the south-east passing through the commune and the village and continuing north-east to Boussières. The D466 road goes south-east from the village then north-east to join the D107 at the north-eastern corner of the commune. The commune is mixed forest and farmland.

The commune is situated on the south bank of the river Doubs where it loops south after flowing from the Jura mountains in Switzerland in a U-shaped course through Besançon before passing along the northern border of Abbans-Dessous then feeding into the river Saône at Verdun-sur-le-Doubs.

Neighbouring Communes and Villages

Toponymy
Abbans appears in the forms:
 Habens in 1148;
 Abans in 1182;
 Abbans in 1250;
 Abbans villa in 1252;
 Abens-la-Ville in 1278;
 Abbantum in 1297;
 Abbans in 1368;
 Abbans-la-Ville in 1629

The name is based on a German man's name Abbo with the Germanic suffix -ing.

History
The history of Abbans-Dessous (previously called Abbans-la-Ville) can not be separated from that of Abbans-Dessus (previously called Abbans-le-Château). At the lower end is a church surrounded by a cemetery, the priory of Lieu-Dieu, a mill on the Doubs river; at the upper end are the two châteaux - Front and Rear - which preceded their respective villages.

Administration

List of Successive Mayors of Abbans-Dessous

Intercommunality
Abbans-Dessous is a member of the Community of communes Loue-Lison, which was created on 1 January 2017. It comprises 74 communes, and has its seat in Ornans.

Population

Sites and monuments

 The Priory of Lieu-Dieu (11th century) is listed as a historical monument. The church contains the Tombstone of Jean d'Abbans (knight) (14th century) which is listed as a historical object.

See also
 Communes of the Doubs department

References

External links
 Abbans-Dessous on Géoportail, National Geographic Institute (IGN)  website 
 Abans-deßous on the 1750 Cassini Map

Communes of Doubs